Thomas Anthony Williams (born 10 February 1948) is an English prelate of the Roman Catholic Church. He currently serves as Auxiliary Bishop of the Archdiocese of Liverpool.

Early life and ministry
Born on Shrove Tuesday, 10 February 1948, in Liverpool, Tom Williams entered Junior Seminary to train for the priesthood at Christleton Hall, Chester in 1961 before studying at the English College in Lisbon, Portugal, from September 1966 to 1971. He completed his studies at St Joseph's College, Upholland. Williams was ordained to the priesthood on 27 May 1972, at the Liverpool Metropolitan Cathedral of Christ the King, by Archbishop George Andrew Beck.

He served at several parishes, including: St Francis of Assisi, Garston; Sacred Heart, Liverpool (where he was also Chaplain to the Royal Liverpool Hospital); Our Lady of Walsingham, Netherton; Our Lady Immaculate, Liverpool and St Anthony's, Scotland Road, Liverpool.

Episcopal career
On 15 April 2003, Williams was appointed Auxiliary Bishop of Liverpool and Titular Bishop of Mageo by Pope John Paul II. He received his episcopal consecration on the following 27 May from Archbishop Patrick Kelly, with Bishops Vincent Malone and Augustine Harris serving as co-consecrators.

On 27 May 2012 Bishop Williams celebrated the Ruby Jubilee of his ordination to the Priesthood. It also marked the ninth anniversary of his Episcopal Ordination as Bishop of Mageo and Auxiliary Bishop of Liverpool in the same Cathedral by Archbishop Patrick Kelly on 27 May 2003.

As Auxiliary Bishop of Liverpool he also serves as Chair of the Healthcare Reference Group of the Bishops' Conference of England and Wales.

Honours
 He was awarded the Freedom of the City of Liverpool on 30 September 2021.

References

External links
Catholic-Hierarchy website: Bishop Thomas Williams
Archdiocese of Liverpool Website

1948 births
Living people
21st-century Roman Catholic bishops in England
Roman Catholic bishops of Liverpool